Alaâ  is a village and commune located in the Kairouan Governorate, Tunisia. The population was 2,657 in 2004.

References

Populated places in Kairouan Governorate
Communes of Tunisia